Chandrasekhar Bhaskar Bhave is an Indian financial regulator. He was appointed as Chairman of the Securities and Exchange Board of India (SEBI) in February 2008 for a period of three years. He was succeeded by Upendra Kumar Sinha as the chairman of SEBI after his tenure. He was SEBI's senior executive director from 1992 - 1996. After that he became Chairman and Managing Director of the then newly created National Securities Depository Limited (NSDL). He is also member of the governments technology advisory group, TAGUP. He is the chairperson of the Indian Institute for Human Settlements (IIHS).

Many prominent personalities including Jaswant Singh (Former Finance Minister), Vinod Rai (Former Comptroller and Auditor General), Deepak Parekh (Chairman, Housing Development Finance Corporation), Jairam Ramesh (Rural Development Minister) have described Bhave as an "outstanding, honest and upright" officer.

Early life
C. B. Bhave was born in Nagpur, Maharashtra. He is an electrical engineer from Jabalpur Engineering College and 1975 batch IAS officer.

Career
C. B. Bhave started out an IAS officer in Maharashtra. He was additional Industries Commissioner of Maharashtra for three years. He moved up to the Centre with a position as undersecretary in the Ministry of Finance and deputy secretary in the Ministry of Petroleum.

When G. V. Ramakrishna became chairman of SEBI, he invited Bhave to join SEBI. This gave a highly successful first stint at SEBI, which ushered in the revolution of the Indian equity market.

Bhave had irreconcilable differences with D. R. Mehta, the SEBI Chairman, and strong views about the direction of reforms of the equity market. He left SEBI to lead what was then a startup, the National Securities Depository Ltd. (NSDL). NSDL had been incubated inside NSE but for all practical purposes, it was a startup when Bhave took over as managing director. This was also a highly successful period, where India made the transition into dematerialised settlement at the depository.

After this, Bhave came back to SEBI as chairman for three years.

References

Businesspeople from Nagpur
Securities and Exchange Board of India
Indian Administrative Service officers
Living people
Year of birth missing (living people)